is a Japanese male volleyball player. He plays in V.League Division 1 for Wolf Dogs Nagoya and Japan men's national volleyball team. He was the captain of Japan U-21 national team.

National teams 
 Japan men's national under-19 volleyball team (2015)
 
 Japan men's national under-20 volleyball team (2016)
 2016 Asian Men's U20 Volleyball Championship
 Japan men's national under-21 volleyball team (2015–2017)
 2015 FIVB Volleyball Men's U21 World Championship
 2017 FIVB Volleyball Men's U21 World Championship
 Japan men's national under-23 volleyball team (2017)
 2017 FIVB Volleyball Men's U23 World Championship
  Japan universiade national team (2019)
 2019 Summer Universiade Tournament
 Japan men's national senior volleyball team (2016, 2020–present)

References 

1997 births
Living people
Japanese men's volleyball players
Sportspeople from Yamagata Prefecture
Nippon Sport Science University alumni
Volleyball players at the 2020 Summer Olympics
Olympic volleyball players of Japan
21st-century Japanese people